Shui On Centre is a 35-storey Grade A office building in Wan Chai North, Hong Kong. The building was completed in May 1987.

In neighbors the Hong Kong Convention and Exhibition Centre and Grand Hyatt Hong Kong.

It has the head office of the publisher of the Hong Kong Post.

See also
Shui On Land, the flagship property company of the Hong Kong-based Shui On Group

References

External links

Shui On Properties

Wan Chai North
Skyscraper office buildings in Hong Kong
Office buildings completed in 1987